The I.Ae. 27 Pulqui I was an Argentine jet designed at the "Instituto Aerotecnico" (AeroTechnical Institute) in 1946. Only one prototype was completed; unsatisfactory performance led to the aircraft being superseded by a later design.

Design and development

The design was created by a team led by the French engineer Émile Dewoitine which included engineers Juan Ignacio San Martín (mil.), Enrique Cardeilhac, Cesare Pallavicino and Norberto L. Morchio.

The fuselage was semi-monocoque with an elliptical cross-section housing a single Rolls-Royce Derwent 5 engine with the air intake in the nose and the ducting surrounding the cockpit. The reduced internal fuselage volume forced the fuel tanks to be installed in the wings, which resulted in a significant reduction of its range.

Operational history

The prototype flew on 9 August 1947 with test pilot 1st. Lt. Osvaldo Weiss at the controls. The history of this aircraft was brief, limited to testing and evaluation of the only prototype, as its performance was considered unsatisfactory and in the meantime studies for the more developed FMA IAe 33 Pulqui II were quite advanced. Nevertheless, its role in the history of aviation is quite significant as it was the first jet aircraft developed and built in Argentina and Latin America.

Operators

Argentine Air Force

Aircraft on display

The restored prototype is currently displayed at the Museo Nacional de Aeronáutica de Argentina of the Argentine Air Force at Morón, Buenos Aires, Argentina.

Specifications

See also

References

Notes

Bibliography
 "Article on the 50th anniversary of the "Fabrica Militar de Aviones"(in Spanish)- listing all the aircraft developed and manufactured there since 1927. Aerospacio (Buenos Aires), 1977.
 Jane's All the World's Aircraft 1951. London: Jane's All the World's Aircraft, 1951.
 Ogden, Bob. Aviation Museums and Collections of the Rest of the World. Tonbridge, Kent, UK: Air-Britain (Historians) Ltd., 2008. .

Further reading
 Burzaco, Ricardo. Las Alas de Perón (Wings of Perón) . Buenos Aires: Artes Gráficas Morello, 1995. .

External links

  Development and Specifications
 IAe 27 Pulqui / Flickr
   "El Pulqui vuelve a sobrevolar la historia" - Article about Pulqui I restoration and history, La Nacion newspaper, 2001-10-08 (retrieved 2014-05-16)
 IPMSStockholm.org (en) article about Pulqui I & II, with illustrations. (retrieved 2019-02-24)

IAe27
1940s Argentine fighter aircraft
Single-engined jet aircraft
Low-wing aircraft
Abandoned military aircraft projects of Argentina
Aircraft first flown in 1947